Sir Richard Warburton (died 1610) was an English Member of Parliament.

Richard Warburton may also refer to:
 Richard Warburton (died 1716), Member of Parliament for Portarlington (Parliament of Ireland constituency)
 Richard Warburton (died 1717), Member of Parliament for Ballyshannon (Parliament of Ireland constituency)
 Richard Warburton (died 1747), Member of Parliament for Portarlington and Ballynakill (Parliament of Ireland constituency)
 Richard Warburton (died 1771), Member of Parliament for Queen's County (Parliament of Ireland constituency)
 Richard Warburton Lytton (1745–1810), English landowner